The 2016–17 UNC Wilmington Seahawks men's basketball team represented the University of North Carolina at Wilmington during the 2016–17 NCAA Division I men's basketball season. The Seahawks were led by third-year head coach Kevin Keatts and played their home games at the Trask Coliseum as members of the Colonial Athletic Association. They finished the season 29–6, 15–3 in CAA play to win the regular season championship, their third consecutive championship. They defeated Delaware, William & Mary, and the College of Charleston to win the CAA tournament. As a result, they earned the conference's automatic bid to the NCAA tournament for the second consecutive year. As the No. 12 seed in the East region, they lost in the first round to Virginia.

On March 17, 2017, head coach Kevin Keatts left the school to accept the head coaching position at NC State. On Apiril 3, the school hired longtime North Carolina assistant C.B. McGrath as head coach.

Previous season
The Seahawks finished the 2015–16 season 25–8, 14–4 in CAA play to finish in a tie for the CAA regular season championship with Hofstra. They won the CAA tournament to earn the conference's automatic bid to the NCAA tournament where they lost in the first round to Duke.

Offseason

Departures

Incoming transfers

Under NCAA transfer rules, Tyrone Taylor will sit out for the 2016–17 season, and will have three years of remaining eligibility entering the 2017–18 season.

Recruiting class of 2016

Preseason 
The Seahawks were picked to finish in first place in the conference's preseason poll. Chris Flemmings was named Preseason Player of the Year and Denzel Ingram was named to the CAA preseason second-team. C. J. Bryce was named an honorable mention.

Roster

Schedule and results

|-
!colspan=9 style=| Exhibition

|-
!colspan=9 style=| Non-conference regular season

|-
!colspan=9 style=| CAA regular season

|-
!colspan=9 style=| CAA tournament

|-
!colspan=9 style="background:#006666; color:#FFFF66;"|NCAA tournament

Rankings

*AP does not release post-NCAA Tournament rankings

See also
2016–17 UNC Wilmington Seahawks women's basketball team

References

UNC Wilmington Seahawks men's basketball seasons
Unc Wilmington
Unc Wilmington